The Whisky War, also known as the Liquor Wars, was a pseudo-confrontation and border dispute between Denmark and Canada over Hans Island. From 1978 to 2022, Hans Island was in the middle of a disagreement between the two nations.

Canadian newspaper The Globe and Mail reported on June 10, 2022, that the Canadian and Danish governments had settled on a border across the island, dividing it between the Canadian territory of Nunavut and the Danish autonomous territory of Greenland. This happened as the 2022 Russian invasion of Ukraine was taking place, as the end of the territorial dispute was meant to represent a signal for other countries (Russia in particular) that disputes can be resolved peacefully.

Background 

Hans Island is in the middle of the Kennedy Channel between Greenland and Ellesmere Island. A theoretical line in the middle of the strait goes through the island. Canada and Denmark could not come to terms on Hans Island in 1973 when a border treaty was signed, leaving a gap in its border description.

Conflict and peaceful resolution
In 1984, Canadian soldiers "provoked" Denmark by planting the Canadian flag on the island and leaving a bottle of Canadian whisky. The Danish Minister of Greenland Affairs came to the island himself the same year with the Danish flag, a bottle of Schnapps, and a letter stating "Welcome to the Danish Island". The two countries proceeded to take turns planting their flags on the island and exchanging alcoholic beverages. The flags were folded properly and respectfully. There have also been Google ads used to "promote their claims". Despite the seriousness, it was all done in a friendly manner. 

Both countries agreed on a process in 2005 to resolve the issue, which was finally settled in 2022.

This minor border dispute is often considered humorous between the two nations, with residents displaying their humour. Despite the serious official nature of the matter, the manner in which the conflict was prosecuted was light-hearted, demonstrated by the length of time taken to settle the dispute, if nothing else. Both nations are on friendly terms, and are also founding members of NATO. Virtually no significant change aside from total land area of the two nations has been made. The resolution also had the side effect of giving Canada and Denmark a land border with each other, which means that both countries no longer border only one other country (the United States and Germany, respectively).

Timeline 
 1980–1983 – Canadian firm Dome Petroleum did research on and around the island.
1984 - Canadian soldiers place a bottle of Canadian whisky and their flag on the island.
 1984 – Tom Høyem, Danish Minister for Greenland, chartered a helicopter to the island, placing a flag and a bottle there.
 1988 – The Danish Arctic Ocean patrol cutter  arrived at the island, built a cairn and placed a flagpole and Danish flag on the island.
 1995 – The Danish liaison officer and geodesists flew in and placed another flagpole and flag.
 2001 – Keith Dewing and Chris Harrison, geologists with the Geological Survey of Canada who were mapping northern Ellesmere Island, flew by helicopter to the island.
 August 13, 2002 – The Danish inspection ship  arrived and erected a new cairn, flagpole and flag, finding the 1988 flag missing and the 1995 flag in pieces.
 August 1, 2003 – The crew of the Danish frigate  landed on the island and replaced the Danish flag again.
 July 13, 2005 – Canadian soldiers land on the Island, placing a traditional Inuit stone marker (Inukshuk) with a plaque and a Canadian flag.
 July 20, 2005 – As a symbolic move, Canadian Defence Minister Bill Graham set foot on the island.
 July 25, 2005 – A Danish government official announced Denmark would issue a letter of protest to Canada.
 July 25, 2005 – Deputy premier of Greenland, Josef Motzfeldt, stated the island had been occupied by Canada, stating experts should determine which country the island belongs to.
 July 28, 2005 – The Danish Ambassador to Canada published an article in the Ottawa Citizen newspaper regarding the Danish view on the Hans Island issue.
 August 4, 2005 – The Danish Arctic/Ocean patrol cutter HDMS Tulugaq was sent from Naval Station Grønnedal to Hans Island to assert Danish sovereignty. The cutter was expected to arrive in three weeks' time.
 August 8, 2005 – Danish newspapers reported Canada wished to open negotiations regarding the future of Hans Island. The news was welcomed by Danish Prime Minister Anders Fogh Rasmussen, who stated "It is time to stop the flag war. It has no place in a modern, international world. Countries like Denmark and Canada must be able to find a peaceful solution in a case such as this."
 August 16, 2005 – According to Danish Foreign Minister Per Stig Møller, Denmark and Canada agreed to reopen negotiations regarding the future of Hans Island. Denmark would immediately begin geological surveys in the area, and Per Stig Møller would meet his Canadian counterpart Pierre Pettigrew in New York City in the middle of September. Should they fail to reach an agreement, both governments have agreed to submit the dispute to the International Court of Justice in The Hague. The government of Greenland agreed to this course of action. Regarding the Danish patrol cutter HDMS Tulugaq then en route to Hans Island, the minister stated "I have instructed the ship to sail there, but they will not go ashore tearing down [the Canadian] flag and replacing it with a new one. It would be a somewhat childish [behaviour] between two NATO allies."
 August 20, 2005 – Canada's Foreign Affairs Minister, Pierre Pettigrew, stated Canada's claim to the island had a firm basis in international law and would likely not end up before a world court. "Our sovereignty over the island has a very strong foundation", the minister said in a telephone interview with a Canadian Press journalist.
 September 19, 2005 – According to Canada's Foreign Affairs Minister, Pierre Pettigrew, Canada and Denmark have agreed on a process to resolve the dispute over the island. Pettigrew and his Danish counterpart, Per Stig Møller, met in New York on this day. Pettigrew said the two countries would work together "to put this issue behind us." However Pettigrew reiterated Canada has sovereignty over the island.
 August 16, 2006 – A Vancouver geologist receives a prospecting permit for Hans Island from the Canadian government.
 March 17, 2007 – Scientists from the University of Toronto and the Technical University of Denmark announced plans to install an automated weather station on the island, some time in the summer of 2007.
 July 2007 – Canada updates satellite photos and recognizes its line constructed for the earlier maritime agreement would have run roughly through the middle of the island; negotiations continue with Denmark over establishing an international land boundary or island sovereignty.
 May 4, 2008 – An international group of scientists from Australia, Canada, Denmark, and the UK installed an automated weather station on Hans Island.
April 11, 2012 – Proposal for Canada and Denmark to split Hans Island.
November 29, 2012 – Canada and Denmark settle an agreement on the exact border between them, though without defining the border near Hans Island.
May 23, 2018 – Canada and Denmark announce a joint task force to settle the dispute over Hans Island.
February 2019 – Canadian geologist John Robins is granted a minerals exploration claim for Hans Island by the Canadian government as part of efforts to help the cause of Canada's sovereignty claim.
September 12, 2019 – The Government of Greenland decided to approve a temporary closure of Hans Island for the application for mineral exploration permits. This approval was based on an agreement between Canada and Denmark. The Canadian geologist John Robins therefore also had his minerals exploration claim for Hans Island suspended by the Canadian government. The Dane Andreas G. Jensen also had his application for mineral exploration permit rejected by the Kingdom of Denmark, because of this closure agreement.
 June 10, 2022 – Meant as evidence on the possibility of diplomatic approaches while the 2022 Russian invasion of Ukraine developed, Canada and Denmark settled on a border across the island, dividing it between the Canadian territory of Nunavut and the semi-autonomous Danish constituent country of Greenland.
 June 14, 2022 – The plan for dividing the island between the two nations was officially unveiled.

See also 
 Pig War (1859)
 War of the Bucket

References

1980s conflicts
1990s conflicts
2000s conflicts
2010s conflicts
2020s conflicts
1980s in Canada
1990s in Canada
2000s in Canada
2010s in Canada
2020s in Canada
1980s in Denmark
1990s in Denmark
2000s in Denmark
2010s in Denmark
2020s in Denmark
Conflicts in Canada
Battles and conflicts without fatalities
Land disputes
Canada–Denmark relations
Canada–Greenland relations
Canada–Greenland border
Reactions to the 2022 Russian invasion of Ukraine